Bilbobus is the name for metropolitan bus services in Bilbao.

The service is owned by the city council of Bilbao. Operations will be transferred to Veolia Transport, the company that won the contract in May 2008. The buses can be distinguished by their red colour and large white lettering, and there are 28 major lines serving the city, with eight smaller lines connecting the town centre with neighborhoods with narrow streets where normal buses can't drive. Plus eight night lines, called Gautxori.

Bilbobus has recently won a European Union prize for service excellence. It is part of a wider transport network operated by the Basque government, recent additions to which include the Metro Bilbao underground and the tram line. They link the Renfe, Euskotren Trena and FEVE train services and are heavily integrated by means of the Barik card to provide ease of movement in the city.

The company's branding takes the Basque language name for the city, Bilbo.

Lines

The following is a list of the lines operated by Bilbobus, taken from their website:

 01 Arangoiti - Plaza Biribila
 03 Plaza Biribila - Otxarkoaga
 10 Elorrieta - Plaza Biribila
 11 Deustu - Atxuri
 13 San Ignazio - Txurdinaga
 18 San Ignazio - Zorrotza
 22 Sarrikue - Atxuri
 27 Arabella - Betolatza
 28 Uribarri - Altamira
 30 Txurdinaga - Miribilla
 34 Otxarkoaga - Santutxu
 38 Otxarkoaga - Termibus
 40 La Peña - Plaza Biribila
 43 Garaizar - Santutxu
 48 Santutxu - Lezeaga
 50 Buia - Plaza Biribila
 56 La Peña - Jesusen Bihotza
 57 Miribilla - Ospitalea
 58 Mintegitxueta - Atxuri
 62 San Mames - Arabella
 71 Miribilla - San Ignazio
 72 Larraskitu - Castaños/Gazteleku
 75 San Adrián - Atxuri
 76 Artatzu/Xalbador - Moyúa
 77 Peñascal - Mina Del Morro
 85 Zazpilanda - Atxuri
 88 Kastrexana - Indautxu

Local District Lines (Auzobus) 
A1: Asunción - Plaza Biribila
A2: Solokoetxe - Plaza Biribila
A3: Olabeaga - Moyua
A4: Zorrotzaurre - Deustu
A5: Prim - Plaza Biribila
A6: Arangoiti - Deustu
A7: Artxanda - Arenal
A8: San Justo - Ametzola

Night lines (Gautxori) 
G1: Arabella - Moyua
G2: Otxarkoaga - Plaza Biribila
G3: Larraskitu - Plaza Biribila
G4: La Peña - Plaza Biribila
G5: San Adrian/Miribilla - Plaza Biribila
G6: Altamira/Zorrotza - Plaza Biribila
G7: Mina Del Morro - Plaza Biribila
G8: Arangoiti - Plaza Biribila

Special Lines (Especial) 
E1: Plaza Biribila - Bilbao Arena
E2: Plaza Biribila - Fronton Bizkaia

Ridership 

After the inauguration of Metro Bilbao in 1995, the number of passengers transported by Bilbobus fell from 32 million to around 29 million. The underground's extension to the neighborhood of Santutxu in 1997, accelerated the decline in ridership, and it fell below 23 million in 1999. Some lines were suppressed, and the number of bus units used was lowered.

A reorganization of lines, and an improvement of the service have led to an increase of the ridership. The number of passengers has risen around 3 to 4 per cent yearly, and is expected to reach more than 28 million in 2008, its highest level in ten years.

Busiest lines in 2007 
 Peñascal - Mina Del Morro: 2,008,969 passengers
 La Peña - Jesusen Bihotza: 1,959,000 passengers
 Otxarkoaga - Plaza Biribila: 1,789,088 passengers
 Txurdinaga - Miribilla: 1,681,512 passengers
 San Ignazio - Txurdinaga: 1,673,612 passengers

Tickets

Passengers are typically recommended to use a Creditrans ticket of the Barik card. The card is validated each time you board the bus. The Barik card is also valid on trains, Metro Bilbao and BizkaiBus bus services, which extend wider out of the city centre into all of Biscay.

Tickets are also available on board at a flat rate of 1.15 euro.

References

External links

Bilbao bus service in real time with Google Maps

Transport in Bilbao